Hailstone is a surname. Notable people with the surname include: 

Bernard Hailstone (1910–1987), English artist
Dominic Hailstone (born 1973), English film director
Herbert Hailstone (1850–1896), English author and scholar
John Hailstone (1759–1847), English geologist
Reg Hailstone (1901–1963), Australian farmer and civic leader
Samuel Hailstone (1768–1851), English botanist
Vivien Hailstone (1913–2000), Native American designer and educator